Bold is a civil parish in St Helens, Merseyside, England.  It contains six buildings that are recorded in the National Heritage List for England as designated listed buildings, all of which are listed at Grade II.  This grade is the lowest of the three gradings given to listed buildings and is applied to "buildings of national importance and special interest".

The parish is rural. It contained the country houses of Bold Old Hall and Bold Hall, on different sites, both of which have been demolished.  All the listed buildings were associated with these houses, and consist of a farmhouse, stables, a walled garden, a bridge over a moat, and a pair of gate piers.

References

Citations

Sources

Listed buildings in Merseyside
Lists of listed buildings in Merseyside
Buildings and structures in the Metropolitan Borough of St Helens